Mikhail Jibrayil (Mike) Atallah is a Lebanese American computer scientist, a distinguished professor of computer science at Purdue University.

Biography
Atallah received his bachelor's degree from the American University of Beirut in 1975. He then moved to Johns Hopkins University for his graduate studies, earning a master's degree in 1980 and a Ph.D. in 1982 under the supervision of S. Rao Kosaraju. Since that time he has been a member of the Purdue University faculty.

In 2001, Atallah co-founded Arxan Technologies, Inc., a provider of internet anti-piracy and anti-tampering software, and in 2007, he became its chief technology officer.

Research
Atallah has published over 200 papers on topics in algorithms and computer security.

Atallah's thesis work was on the subject of parallel algorithms, and he continued working in that area as a faculty member.
Algorithmic research by Atallah includes papers on parallel  and dynamic computational geometry, finding the symmetries of geometric figures, divide and conquer algorithms, and efficient parallel computations of the Levenshtein distance between pairs of strings. With his student Marina Blanton, Atallah is the editor of the Algorithms and Theory of Computation Handbook (CRC Press, 2nd ed., 2009).

Atallah's more recent research has been in the area of computer security. His work in this area has included techniques for text-based digital watermarking. and the addition of multiple guard points within software as an anti-piracy measure.

Awards and honors
In 2006, Atallah was elected as a fellow of the Association for Computing Machinery for his "contributions to parallel and distributed computation". He has also been a fellow of the IEEE since 1997.

References

Year of birth missing (living people)
Living people
American computer scientists
Theoretical computer scientists
Researchers in geometric algorithms
Computer security academics
American University of Beirut alumni
Johns Hopkins University alumni
Purdue University faculty
Fellows of the Association for Computing Machinery
Fellow Members of the IEEE